Michael Walker is a Paralympic athlete who won five gold medals representing Great Britain. Walker won gold in four category C4 track and field events at the 1988 Summer Paralympics in Seoul, South Korea: the shot put, the discus, the club throw and the javelin. He retained the shot put title in Barcelona 1992.

References

Paralympic gold medalists for Great Britain
Medalists at the 1988 Summer Paralympics
Medalists at the 1992 Summer Paralympics
Paralympic medalists in athletics (track and field)
Athletes (track and field) at the 1988 Summer Paralympics
Athletes (track and field) at the 1992 Summer Paralympics
Paralympic athletes of Great Britain
British male discus throwers
British male javelin throwers
British male shot putters